There are several sporting events incorporating the name Shanghai Masters:

Shanghai Masters (snooker)
Shanghai Masters (tennis)
BMW Masters, golf tournament formerly known as the Lake Malaren Shanghai Masters